Henry Denny (1803–1871) was an English museum curator and entomologist, known as an authority on parasites.

Life
Denny was the first salaried curator of the Leeds Museum, then the museum of the Leeds Literary and Philosophical Society, appointed in 1825. He held that post for 45 years. Also in 1825, he published a monograph on the British species of ant-loving beetles in the genus Pselaphus. The British Association for the Advancement of Science in 1842 made a grant to Denny for the study of British Anoplura; William Kirby tried to bring him in as illustrator of his Introduction to Entomology, though without success.

A good friend of Charles Darwin, Henry Denny would be included in his treatise "The Descent of Man, and Selection in Relation to Sex". A piece of correspondence written by Denny to Darwin found its way into Part One "Race" as supporting evidence to Darwin's Theory of Evolution.

 The passage is as follows:  

"...And yet, on Martial's testimony, humans no different from each other than Englishmen and Sandwich Islanders carried lice so different from each other than there was no cross-infestation" 

Denny died at Leeds on 7 March 1871, at the age of 68.

Works

Denny's published writings were:

 Monographia Pselaphorum et Scydmænorum Britanniæ; or an Essay on the British species of the genera Pselaphus of Herbst, and Scydmænus of Latreille, Norwich, 1825.
 Monographia Anoplurorum Britanniæ; or an Essay on the British species of Parasitic Insects belonging to the order Anoplura of Leach, London, 1842.

Notes

Attribution

1803 births
1871 deaths
English entomologists
English curators
British parasitologists